Louise Gamman (born 28 August 1983) is a basketball player who has been in England's national team. She won a bronze medal at the 2006 Commonwealth Games. She was part of England's first women's basketball squad that competed at the Commonwealth Games. She has called for the sport to be kept in the Commonwealth Games.

References

English women's basketball players
1983 births
Living people
People from West Drayton
Commonwealth Games medallists in basketball
Commonwealth Games bronze medallists for England
Basketball players at the 2006 Commonwealth Games
Medallists at the 2006 Commonwealth Games